Budaun railway station is a main railway station in Badaun district, Uttar Pradesh. Its code is BEM. It serves Budaun city. The station consists of three platforms after gauge conversion of bareilly to kasganj railway line  railway station was renovated .

The Rohilkhand and Kumaon Railway started construction of railway line from Bhojipura to  under a contract dated 12 October 1882. This was the main line, 53.92 miles in length sanctioned in 1882 and opened on 12 October 1884. Later this line was extended from Bareilly to Soron in 1906.

The railway line Kasganj–Soron section was constructed by the Rajputana and  Malwa Railways in 1885 when it was constructing the Kanpur–Achnera section. Later on, when the R&KR constructed the Bareilly–Soron line in 1906 the short section Soron–Kasganj was given over to it. The MG extensions from Moradabad to Kashipur, from Kashipur to Ramnagar and Lalkuan to Kashipur were completed by 1908.

Budaun railway station is well connected to, Ajmer Junction railway station, Jaipur Junction railway station, Bandra Terminus, Gonda Junction railway station, Gorakhpur Junction railway station, Darbhanga Junction, Vadodara, Kota Junction, Ratlam Junction, Tundla Junction,  Mainpuri railway station,  Farrukhabad Junction railway station, Mathura Junction, Ujhani, Bareilly, Gonda, Soron, Ramnagar, Bahraich, Agra, Pilibhit, Kasganj, Lakhimpur, Sitapur, Gola Gokarannath, Tanakpur, and Mumbai Central, etc.

Gallery

References

Railway stations in Budaun district
Izzatnagar railway division
Budaun